AC3 or AC-3 may refer to:

Science and technology
 Dolby AC-3, Dolby Digital audio codec
 AC-3 algorithm (Arc Consistency Algorithm 3), one of a series of algorithms used for the solution of constraint satisfaction problems
 (35414) 1998 AC3, a minor planet
 AC-3, an IEC utilization category
 AC3 (All Content Creators Currency), a cryptocurrency aimed at content creators
 Ambedkar Community Computing Center (AC3)

Transportation
 Comte AC-3, a 1920s Swiss bomber/transport aircraft
 Southern Pacific class AC-3, a class of steam locomotive

Video games
 Ace Combat 3, part of the Ace Combat series of video games
 Armored Core 3, part of the Armored Core series of video games
 Assassin's Creed III, part of the Assassin's Creed series of video games